(Maria) Dorothea Wendling, née Spurni (21 March 1736 – 20 August 1811) was a German soprano. Born in  Stuttgart, she is remembered for being the singer for whom Mozart wrote the role of Ilia in Idomeneo, re di Creta. She sang the role of Sabina in the 1768 premiere of Ignaz Holzbauer's opera , based on Metastasio's libretto of that name.

In 1752 she married flautist and composer Johann Baptist Wendling. They had a daughter,  (1752–1794). Her sister-in-law was Elisabeth Wendling (1746–1786). Elisabeth and Dorothea performed in the 1772 premiere of Johann Christian Bach's Temistocle. Dorothea Wendling died in Munich.

References

1736 births
1811 deaths
Musicians from Stuttgart
German operatic sopranos
Wolfgang Amadeus Mozart's singers
18th-century German women opera singers